Valbandon is a village in the municipality of Fažana, in Istria County, Croatia. In 2011 it had a population of 1626.

References

Populated places in Istria County